The 15th ACTRA Awards were presented on April 2, 1986 to honour achievements in Canadian television production in 1985. They were the final ACTRA Awards presented before the responsibility for organizing and presenting Canadian television awards was transferred from ACTRA to the Academy of Canadian Cinema and Television.

The ceremony was hosted by Don Harron, Pierre Berton, Barbara Frum, Gordon Pinsent, Dave Broadfoot and Ann Mortifee.

Due to overlapping eligibility periods, some of the nominees or winners at the 15th ACTRA Awards were also nominees or winners at the 1st Gemini Awards, which were presented in December 1986.

Television

Radio

Journalism and special awards

References

1986 in Canadian television
1986 television awards
ACTRA Awards